Béke téri Stadion is a sports venue in Csepel, a district of Budapest, Hungary. The stadium is home to the association football side Csepel FC. The stadium has a capacity of 12,000.

Photo gallery

References

External links 
Magyarfutball.hu 

Football venues in Hungary